Odalys Adams Castillo (born August 1, 1966 in Camagüey) is a Cuban hurdler.

International competitions

External links

1966 births
Living people
Sportspeople from Camagüey
Cuban female hurdlers
Athletes (track and field) at the 1987 Pan American Games
Athletes (track and field) at the 1991 Pan American Games
Athletes (track and field) at the 1995 Pan American Games
Athletes (track and field) at the 1992 Summer Olympics
Olympic athletes of Cuba
Pan American Games medalists in athletics (track and field)
Pan American Games silver medalists for Cuba
Pan American Games bronze medalists for Cuba
Competitors at the 1986 Central American and Caribbean Games
Competitors at the 1990 Central American and Caribbean Games
Central American and Caribbean Games gold medalists for Cuba
Central American and Caribbean Games silver medalists for Cuba
World Athletics Championships athletes for Cuba
Central American and Caribbean Games medalists in athletics
Competitors at the 1989 Summer Universiade
Competitors at the 1990 Goodwill Games
Medalists at the 1991 Pan American Games
Medalists at the 1995 Pan American Games
20th-century Cuban women
20th-century Cuban people